Anthocharis limonea, the Mexican orangetip, is a butterfly of the subfamily Pierinae mostly found in Mexico and the southwestern United States.

References 

limonea
Butterflies of North America